Sedona  is a city that straddles the county line between Coconino and Yavapai counties in the northern Verde Valley region of the U.S. state of Arizona. As of the 2010 census, its population was 10,031. It is within the Coconino National Forest.

Sedona's main attraction is its array of red sandstone formations. The formations appear to glow in brilliant orange and red when illuminated by the rising or setting sun. The red rocks form a popular backdrop for many activities, ranging from spiritual pursuits to the hundreds of hiking and mountain biking trails. Sedona is also the home to the nationally recognized McDonald's with turquoise arches, instead of the traditional Golden Arches.

Sedona was named after Sedona Arabella Miller Schnebly (1877–1950), the wife of Theodore Carlton Schnebly, the city's first postmaster. She was celebrated for her hospitality and industriousness. Her mother, Amanda Miller, claimed to have made the name up because "it sounded pretty".

History

Anglo-American settlement
The first Anglo settler, John J. Thompson, moved to Oak Creek Canyon in 1876, an area well known for its peach and apple orchards. The early settlers were farmers and ranchers. In 1902, when the Sedona post office was established, there were 55 residents. In the mid-1950s, the first telephone directory listed 155 names. Some parts of the Sedona area were not electrified until the 1960s.

Sedona began to develop as a tourist destination, vacation-home and retirement center in the 1950s. Most of the development seen today was constructed in the 1980s and 1990s. As of 2007, there are no large tracts of undeveloped land remaining.

Important early settlers included the Steele family, originally of Scotland.

Chapel of the Holy Cross
In 1956, construction of the Chapel of the Holy Cross was completed. The chapel rises  out of a  redrock cliff. The most prominent feature of the chapel is the cross. Later a chapel was added. Inside the chapel there is a window and a cross with benches and pews.

Cinematic legacy
Sedona played host to more than sixty Hollywood productions from the first years of movies into the 1970s. Stretching as far back as 1923, Sedona's red rocks were a fixture in major Hollywood productionsincluding films such as Angel and the Badman, Desert Fury, Blood on the Moon, Johnny Guitar, The Last Wagon, and 3:10 to Yuma. However, the surroundings typically were identified to audiences as the terrain of Texas, California, Nevada, and even Canada–US border territory. The town lent its name to the 2011 film Sedona, which is set in the community.

Brins Fire

On June 18, 2006, a wildfire, reportedly started by campers, began about one mile (1.61 km) north of Sedona. The Brins Fire covered  on Brins Mesa, Wilson Mountain and in Oak Creek Canyon before the USDA Forest Service declared it 100 percent contained on June 28. Containment cost was estimated at $6.4 million.

Slide Fire 
On May 20, 2014, a wildfire started from an unknown cause began north of Sedona at Slide Rock State Park. The Slide Fire spread across 21,227 acres in Oak Creek Canyon over nine days and prompted evacuations. State Route 89A opened to Flagstaff in June, but all parking and canyon access was closed to the public until October 1, 2014.

Geography

Sedona is located in the interior chaparral, semi-desert grassland, Great Basin conifer woodland biomes of northern Arizona. Sedona has mild winters and warm summers.

Flora
Sedona interior chaparral has many shrubs and small tree species of Quercus turbinella and Rhus ovata and a large population of Quercus palmeri. The Great Basin woodland has many small to medium trees of Pinus monophylla Var. fallax, Juniperus arizonica, Juniperus deppeana, Juniperus osteosperma, and Juniperus monosperma and a large population of Cupressus glabra. At higher elevations in Oak Creek Canyon Juniperus virginiana, Pinus edulis and other pines occur.

Geology

The red rocks of Sedona are formed by a unique layer of rock known as the Schnebly Hill Formation. The Schnebly Hill Formation is a thick layer of red to orange-colored sandstone found only in the Sedona vicinity. The sandstone, a member of the Supai Group, was deposited during the Permian Period.

Climate
Sedona has a temperate semi-arid climate. In January, the average high temperature is 57 °F (14 °C) with a low of 31 °F (−1 °C). In July, the average high temperature is 97 °F (34 °C) with a low of 64 °F (17 °C).

Demographics

As of the census of 2000, there were 10,192 people, 4,928 households, and 2,863 families residing in the city. The racial makeup of the city was 92.2% White, 0.5% Black or African American, 0.5% Native American, 0.9% Asian, 0.1% Pacific Islander, 4.3% from other races, and 1.6% from two or more races. 8.9% of the population were Hispanic or Latino of any race.

At the 2000 census there were 7,229 people living in the Yavapai County (western) portion of the city (70.9% of its population) and 2,963 living in the Coconino County (eastern) portion (29.1%). By land area Yavapai had 66.2% of its area, versus 33.8% for Coconino.

There were 4,928 households, out of which 15.8% had children under the age of 18 living with them, 48.6% were married couples living together, 6.6% had a female householder with no husband present, and 41.9% were non-families. 32.2% of all households were made up of individuals, and 14.2% had someone living alone who was 65 years of age or older. The average household size was 2.06 and the average family size was 2.52.

In the city, the population was spread out, with 13.7% under the age of 18, 4.5% from 18 to 24, 21.2% from 25 to 44, 35.0% from 45 to 64, and 25.6% who were 65 years of age or older. The median age was 50 years. For every 100 females, there were 88.1 males. For every 100 females age 18 and over, there were 85.9 males.

The median income for a household in the city was $44,042, and the median income for a family was $52,659. Males had a median income of $32,067 versus $24,453 for females. The per capita income for the city was $31,350. About 4.7% of families and 9.7% of the population were below the poverty line, including 12.1% of those under age 18 and 5.0% of those age 65 or over.

Arts and culture
The Sedona area hosts numerous events annually, including:
 St. Patrick's Parade, Celebration of Spring, Sedona Food Truck Festival, Red Dirt Concerts, Pumpkin Splash, and WagFest and Fair are just a few of the community events offered by the local Parks and Recreation Department.
 Sedona Marathon
 The Sedona Miracle Annual Charity Fundraiser

 Sedona Bluegrass Festival (2007–2014)
 Sedona Hummingbird Festival (2012–present);
 The Sedona Solstice Festivals (Summer and Winter) at Unity of Sedona (2012–present)

Sedona hosts several notable arts organizations in Northern Arizona:
 Chamber Music Sedona sponsors a chamber-music program annually from October to May. The 2012–2013 season marked the 30th anniversary for the organization.
 The Sedona Arts Center, founded in 1958, is the oldest arts center in northern Arizona.
 Sedona International Film Festival & Workshop was established in 1995. The week-long annual festival takes place in late February and early March at Harkins Theatres, while supplemental events take place at area resorts and restaurants. The festival also hosts monthly events, and they sponsor the MET: Live in HD opera broadcasts in Sedona.
 NORAZ Poets, extant from 2003 to 2007, was a nonprofit poetry network based in Sedona.
 Greg Lawson Galleries, a popular local art gallery in Sedona.

A specialized New Age tourist industry operates in Sedona, where José Arguelles organized the "Harmonic Convergence" in 1987. Some New Age proponents purport that "spiritual vortices" are concentrated in the Sedona area at Bell Rock, Airport Mesa, Cathedral Rock, and Boynton Canyon.

Government
Politically, Uptown Sedona, the Gallery District and the Chapel area (all in Coconino County) and West Sedona (in Yavapai County) form the City of Sedona. Founded in 1902, it was incorporated as a city in 1988. The unincorporated Village of Oak Creek,  to the south and well outside the Sedona city limits, is a significant part of the Sedona community.

In 2013, Sedona became one of the Arizona municipalities to approve of civil unions for same-sex partners.

Education
Sedona is served by the Sedona-Oak Creek Unified School District.

West Sedona School, serving grades K–6, is located at 570 Posse Ground Road.

Red Rock Early Learning Center is a year-round Preschool program designed for children aged 3–5 years old. Their normal school year runs from August to May each year, with a summer session offered during June and July. It is licensed by the ADHS, and located in West Sedona Elementary School building 300.

Verde Valley School, a boarding International Baccalaureate high school with many international students, is located between the Village of Oak Creek and Red Rock Crossing. It hosts numerous 'traditions' and performances open to the community. Their mascot is the coyote. Total attendance measures about 120 students per year, grades 9–12. Oscar-winning composer James Horner studied there (Titanic, Braveheart, Avatar, Legends of The Fall).

Sedona Red Rock High School (SRRHS), built in 1994, is located on the western edge of town in West Sedona. The school's mascot is the Scorpion. The high school's new campus, a series of single-story buildings, is located opposite the Sedona campus of Yavapai College. As of 2016, Sedona Red Rock High School holds grades 7–8 in the Junior High portion of campus.

Sedona Charter School (SCS) is located behind the Sedona Public Library, serving as a Montessori-based school for grades K–8.

Yavapai College's Sedona Center for Arts & Technology includes the Sedona Film School, which offers certificates in independent filmmaking, the Business Partnership Program, the Osher Lifelong Learning Institute, and the University of Arizona Mini Med School.

Infrastructure

Transportation
Sedona Airport is a non-towered general aviation airport located within the city limits. The nearest commercial airports are Flagstaff Pulliam Airport ( away), Prescott Regional Airport ( away), Grand Canyon National Park Airport ( away), and Phoenix Sky Harbor International Airport ( away).

Healthcare
Verde Valley Medical Center – Sedona Campus is an outpatient facility providing 24/7 emergency services, cancer services, and primary and specialty healthcare to the Sedona/Oak Creek area. The facility is part of the Northern Arizona Healthcare system and is a subdivision of Verde Valley Medical Center in the nearby city of Cottonwood.

Cemeteries
Sedona's oldest burial ground is the Schuerman–Red Rock Cemetery, dating from 1893. Another pioneer cemetery is the Cooks Cedar Gate Cemetery, with an initial burial in 1918. The Sedona Community Cemetery, also known as Sedona Memorial Park, is on Pine Drive.

Notable people

 Robert Adams – American Advaita teacher
 Samaire Armstrong – actress
 Michelle Branch – singer/songwriter

 Brandon Decker - singer/songwriter based in Sedona
 Gail Edwards – actress
 Justin Frankel – computer programmer
 Kevin Geary – English portrait and abstract artist
 Steve George – musician/songwriter (Mr. Mister)
 James Gregory – television actor
 James Horner – film composer (studied at the Verde Valley School in the 1970s)
 Sagan Lewis – actress, former program director of the Sedona International Film Festival
 Drunvalo Melchizedek – New Age author born Bernard Donald Perona
 Tom O'Halleran – U. S. representative

In popular culture

 In 1982 singer Donna Loren released the song "Sedona" on her own label, Royalty Records. The song was written by Loren while living in Sedona. James Burton produced the song with Loren, played guitar, and assembled other members of the Elvis Presley TCB Band: Ronnie Tutt (drums), Jerry Scheff (bass), and Glen D. Hardin (piano). Chris Hillman played mandolin. It was Loren's first recording since 1967, and subsequently appeared on her compilation, Magic: The 80's Collection.
 Esteban released a song titled "Sedona Sunrise".
 Aerosmith released a song titled "Sedona Sunrise", which appears on the best-of collection Devil's Got a New Disguise: The Very Best of Aerosmith.
 The Pixies released a song titled "Havalina" after the species of peccary (wild boar) native to the area. The song appears on their 1990 album Bossanova and mentions Sedona as the setting. The song has been covered by They Might Be Giants for the Pixies tribute album Dig for Fire: A Tribute to the Pixies.
 A film titled Sedona was released in 2012. It was the first feature film to be shot entirely in Sedona since the 1970s when the heyday of Hollywood filmmaking in the area ended. The cast includes Frances Fisher, Seth Peterson, Barry Corbin, Christopher Atkins, Lin Shaye and Beth Grant.
 The racing video games Forza Motorsport 3 and Forza Motorsport 4 feature the fictional track "Sedona Raceway Park".
 In 2015, indie rock band Houndmouth released a single titled "Sedona" off their album Little Neon Limelight. The song makes reference to one of the first big movies filmed there, Stagecoach, and to John Ford, its director. With the lyrics "Hey Little Hollywood, you're gone but you're not forgotten" in the chorus, the song chronicles the ultimate demise of the movie-making industry in Sedona.
George Strait mentions Sedona in his 2019 Honky Tonk Time Machine album on the song "Blue Water".
 In 2020, indie rock band Sir Chloe released “Sedona” on their album Party Favors.

See also

 Mogollon Rim

Notes

External links

 
 

 
1902 establishments in Arizona Territory
Cities in Arizona
Cities in Coconino County, Arizona
Cities in Yavapai County, Arizona
Populated places of the Mogollon Rim
Populated places established in 1902